Frits Sissing (born 18 September 1963) is a Dutch television presenter. He is known for presenting television shows which include Opsporing Verzocht, Tussen Kunst & Kitsch and Maestro. He also presented Blik op de weg and several talent show-themed television series to find a musical theatre performer for a musical.

Career 

He presented the television show Opsporing Verzocht from 1999 to 2007 and from 2011 to 2014.

He won the tenth season of the television series Wie is de Mol?.

He presented the television show Blik op de weg. He presents the television show Tussen Kunst & Kitsch since September 2015. He also presents the television show Maestro.

In 2021, he appeared in the photography game show Het perfecte plaatje in which contestants compete to create the best photo in various challenges. He finished in second place.

He presented the 20th edition of the Musical Awards in April 2022.

Filmography

As presenter 

 Opsporing Verzocht (1999 – 2007, 2011 – 2014)
 Op zoek naar Evita (2007)
 Op zoek naar Mary Poppins (2009, 2010)
 Op zoek naar Zorro (2010, 2011)
 Maestro (2012 – present)
 Blik op de weg (2012 – 2015)
 Tussen Kunst & Kitsch (2015 – present)
 Op zoek naar Maria (2021)
 Op zoek naar Danny & Sandy (2022, 2023)

As contestant 

 Dancing with the Stars (2006)
 Ik hou van Holland (2008, 2012)
 Wie is de Mol? (2010)
 De Jongens tegen de Meisjes (2014)
 Het perfecte plaatje (2021)

References

External links 

 

Living people
1963 births
Place of birth missing (living people)
Dutch television presenters
21st-century Dutch people